Cahors Rugby are a French rugby union club. They currently compete in the Fédérale 1 competition, the third division of rugby in France. The club was established in 1908. They play at Stade Lucien Desprats, in Cahors. They were champions of the Fédérale 2 division in 2003.

Honours
 Deuxième Division:
 Champions: 2005
 Runners-up: 1993
 Fédérale 2:
 Champions: 2003

Notable former players

Alfred Roques
David Auradou
Abdelatif Benazzi
Philippe Benetton
Denis Charvet
Michel Courtiols
Roger Fite
Dominique Harize
Bernard Momméjat

See also
 List of rugby union clubs in France

External links
Official website
Cahors on itsrugby.com

French rugby union clubs